Navalny 35 (also known as the Navalny's List) are a group of Russian human rights abusers, kleptocrats, and corruptioners involved in poisoning and imprisonment of Russian opposition leader Alexei Navalny. The initial list contained 35 individuals.

Background 
On February 8, 2021, Vladimir Ashurkov, Executive Director of Navalny's Anti-Corruption Foundation, recommended the European Union to sanction 35 Russian individuals linked to poisoning and imprisonment of Alexei Navalny.

Earlier, on October 15, 2020, the European Union had imposed sanctions "for the use of chemical weapons for an attempted assassination of Alexei Navalny" on six high-ranking Russian officials and Russian state research institute GosNIIOKhT, which developed chemical weapon agent Novichok. These sanctions include "a travel ban to the EU and asset freezing of individuals and legal entities. In addition, the EU individuals and legal entities are prohibited from providing funds to sanctioned individuals and entities". The UK followed suit on the same day, October 15, 2020.

On March 2, 2021, the European Union imposed sanctions on Russia's chief law enforcement officers in connection with the poisoning of Alexei Navalny. Later that day, the United States imposed sanctions on seven Russian individuals and three organizations in relation to Navalny poisoning and imprisonment.

On March 24, 2021, Canada imposed sanctions on nine Russians on the same grounds.

On August 20, 2021, the UK imposed sanctions on seven FSB officers whom it considers involved in the poisoning. The United States imposed sanctions on nine FSB officers and two organizations. The United States also announced the forthcoming sanctions against Russia for the use of chemical weapons for Navalny poisoning. Sanctions are planned to include additional restrictions on exportation of goods and technologies related to nuclear and missile manufacturing, as well as restrictions on the import of certain types of Russian firearms and ammunition.

On September 22, 2021, the Rules Committee of the United States House of Representatives approved for consideration the US National Defence bill amendment by Representative Tom Malinowski aimed to sanction 35 individuals from the Navalny's list. In the bill they called 'Russian kleptocrats and human rights abusers'.

On October 7, 2021, Helsinki Commission Chairman Senator Ben Cardin and Ranking Member Senator Roger Wicker introduced a bill to the Congress proposing to impose sanctions against individuals on the Navalny 35 list adding them to Global Magnitsky sanctions.

Navalny's List 

In addition to the list presented by the Alexei Navalny's associates the sanctions were earlier imposed on the following persons involved in the poisoning:

And also on organizations:

Russia's reaction 

On February 12, 2021 Russian Foreign Minister Sergei Lavrov announced that Russia is ready to break its relations with the EU should it introduce new sanctions, saying 'if you want peace, prepare for war'.

On September 23, 2021 press secretary of Russian Foreign Ministry, Maria Zakharova, warned the United States against 'ill-considered move on the sanctions track' in relation to the Congress' plans on the introduction of new sanctions against Russian officials.

See also 
 Putin's Kleptocracy
 Russian Asset Tracker

References 

Alexei Navalny
Anti-Corruption Foundation
Lists of Russian people
European Parliament
Politics-related lists
Corruption in Russia
Human rights in Russia
Canada–Russia relations
Russia–European Union relations
Russia–United Kingdom relations
Russia–United States relations
2020s in Russia
2021 in international relations